32K resolution refers to a display resolution of 30720 × 17280 for an aspect ratio of 16:9. This doubles the pixel count of 16K in each dimension, for a total of 530.8 megapixels (530,841,600 pixels), 4x as many pixels than 16K resolution. It has 16 times as many pixels as 8K resolution, 64 times as many pixels as 4K resolution and 256 times the pixels as 1080p resolution.

There are plans from different groups to start implementing 32K technology. While there are a few cameras that can shoot in 32K resolution, 8K still does not have as widespread usage as 1080p and 4K do. There are less than 3% of TVs using 8K, and virtually none using 16K.

Two limiting factors in 32K are Screen Resolution and CPU/GPU capability.

History

Development 

In 2018, Sony installed a 16K screen into the front of a cosmetics store in Yokohama, south of Tokyo. The  widescreen display is believed to be the largest 16K screen yet. Sony has plans to make the product available, in custom sizes, for well-heeled consumers. They are currently working on developing a 32K display.

Currently, 32K resolutions can be run using multi-monitor setups with AMD Eyefinity or Nvidia Surround using 16 8K TVs or monitors.

Technology

Cameras in Development 
Zabriskie Point in 32K Resolution

The Linea HS 32K

Cameras 
Dalsa 32K Super Resolution CLHS Camera

Gaming 
Gaming at 32K is very unlikely to be possible in the near future. To achieve the resolution, sixteen 8K televisions or monitors in a multi-monitor setups with AMD Eyefinity or Nvidia Surround and a very powerful computer are required. Even through the RTX 3090 can only output a maximum of 8K, using two of them in SLI may allow gaming at 32K resolution.

Editing 
Currently, only Blackmagic Designs DaVinci Resolve 17 supports editing at 32K resolution.

See also 
 4K resolution digital video formats with a horizontal resolution of around 4,000 pixels
 5K resolution digital video formats with a horizontal resolution of around 5,000 pixels, aimed at non-television computer monitor usage
 10K resolution digital video formats with a horizontal resolution of around 10,000 pixels, aimed at non-television computer monitor usage
 16K resolution digital video formats with a horizontal resolution of around 16,000 pixels
 Ultra-high-definition television (UHDTV) digital video formats with resolutions of 4K and 8K
 Rec. 2020 ITU-R Recommendation for UHDTV
 Digital movie camera
 Digital cinematography makes extensive use of UHD video
 List of large sensor interchangeable-lens video cameras

References 

Digital imaging
Display technology
Film and video technology